Hypselognathus is a genus of pipefishes endemic to Australia where they are only known from the southern coast.

Species
There are currently two recognized species in this genus:
 Hypselognathus horridus C. E. Dawson & Glover, 1982 (prickly pipefish)
 Hypselognathus rostratus (Waite & Hale, 1921) (knife-snouted pipefish)

References

Syngnathidae
Ray-finned fish genera
Taxa named by Gilbert Percy Whitley